William McCauley Humphries (born 8 June 1936), known as Billy Humphries, was a Northern Irish footballer who played as a winger. He played in the Irish League with Glentoran and Ards, and in England with Leeds United, Coventry City and Swansea Town in the 1950s, 1960s and 1970s. He won 14 international cap for Northern Ireland. He also won three amateur caps for Northern Ireland and twelves caps for the Irish League representative team.

Career
Humphries was a member of Ards' first and only League championship team in 1957–58. He signed for Leeds United in September 1958, but, not having settled, he returned home to Ards in November 1959. During his second spell at Ards he won his first international cap in April 1962 against Wales. The international appearance brought Humphries to the attention of Jimmy Hill, the Coventry City manager, who paid Ards a £14,000 transfer fee a week after the match in Wales. Humphries ended up with fourteen international caps. Humphries won the Third Division title with Coventry in 1963–64, scoring ten goals. During the following season he moved to Second Division Swansea Town, but ended up relegated at the end of the season, and relegated again to the Fourth Division in 1967.

He was released by Swansea in June 1968, and returned to Northern Ireland for his third spell at Ards. He won the Irish Cup in 1969 and was named as Ulster Footballer of the Year for 1969-70 and again for 1971–72. He was also the Northern Ireland Football Writers' Player of the Year for 1971–72. Player-manager from 1970, he was a member of Ards' four-trophy-winning team in 1973–74, winning Irish Cup, Ulster Cup, Gold Cup and Blaxnit Cup medals. He retired as a player in 1976, aged 39, but served as Ards manager until 1978, and again from 1980 to 1982. He then managed Bangor from 1983 to 1985.

Honours
Irish League: 1957–58
Football League Third Division: 1963–64
Welsh Cup: 1965–66
Irish Cup: 1968–69, 1973–74
County Antrim Shield: 1971–72
Ulster Cup: 1973–74
Gold Cup: 1973–74

Individual
Ulster Footballer of the Year: 1969–70, 1971–72
Northern Ireland Football Writers' Association Player of the Year: 1971–72.

Sources

 M. Brodie (ed.), Northern Ireland Soccer Yearbook 2009-2010, p. 102. Belfast:Ulster Tatler Publications
Northern Ireland's Footballing Greats

Living people
1936 births
Association footballers from Northern Ireland
Association football wingers
Northern Ireland international footballers
Irish League representative players
Northern Ireland amateur international footballers
Northern Ireland Football Writers' Association Players of the Year
NIFL Premiership players
Ulster Footballers of the Year
Glentoran F.C. players
Ards F.C. players
Leeds United F.C. players
Coventry City F.C. players
Swansea City A.F.C. players
Football managers from Northern Ireland
Ards F.C. managers
Bangor F.C. managers